Pariacocha (possibly from Quechua parya reddish, copper or sparrow, qucha lake, "reddish (copper or sparrow) lake") is a lake in the Andes of Peru. Paryaqucha is located in the Ancash Region, Pallasca Province, Conchucos District, northwest of Quinuacocha (Quechua for "quinoa lake").

References 

Lakes of Peru
Lakes of Ancash Region